Evelyn Lau (born July 2, 1971) is a Canadian poet and novelist.

Biography 
Evelyn Lau was born in Vancouver, British Columbia on July 2, 1971 to Chinese-Canadian parents from Hong Kong, who intended for her to become a doctor. Her parents' ambitions for her were wholly irreconcilable with her own; consequently, her home and school lives were desperately unhappy. Lau attended Templeton Secondary School in Vancouver. In 1986 Lau ran away from her unbearable existence as a social outcast and pariah in school and a tyrannized daughter at home.

Evelyn Lau began publishing poetry at the age of 12; her creative efforts helped her escape the pressure of home and school. In March 1986, at age 14, Lau left home and spent the next several years living itinerantly in Vancouver as a homeless person, sleeping mainly in shelters, friends' homes, and on the street. She also became involved in prostitution and drug abuse during this time.

Despite the chaos of her first two years' independence, she submitted numerous poems to journals and received some recognition. A diary she kept at the time was published in 1989 as Runaway: Diary of a Street Kid. The book was a critical and commercial success; Lau received praise for frankly chronicling her relationships with manipulative older men, the life and habits of a group of anarchists with whom she stayed immediately after leaving home, her experiences with a couple from Boston who smuggled her into the United States, her abuse of various drugs, and her relationship with British Columbia's child support services. The diary was adapted as a film The Diary of Evelyn Lau (1993), starring Canadian actress Sandra Oh.

Lau had a well-publicized romantic relationship with W. P. Kinsella, a University of Victoria creative writing professor and poet more than 30 years her senior. After she published a personal essay in 1997 about the relationship, Kinsella sued her for libel. ("Me and W.P." won a Western Magazine Award for Human Experience, and was shortlisted for the Gold Award for Best Article). 

Her work in magazines has won four Western Magazine Awards and a National Magazine Award; she also received the Air Canada Award, the Vantage Women of Originality Award, the ACWW Community Builders Award, and the Mayor's Arts Award for Literary Arts. Her poems were selected for inclusion in Best American Poetry (1992) and Best Canadian Poetry (2009, 2010, 2011, 2016). Lau has also worked as writer-in-residence at the University of British Columbia, Kwantlen University, and Vancouver Community College, and was Distinguished Visiting Writer at the University of Calgary.

Lau lives in Vancouver, where she is a manuscript consultant in Simon Fraser University's Writing and Publishing Program.  On Oct. 14, 2011, Lau was named the poet laureate for the city of Vancouver.  She is the third poet to hold this honorary position; her plan is to offer 'poet-in-residence consultations with aspiring poets'.

Bibliography

Memoirs
Runaway: Diary of a Street Kid - (HarperCollins,1989) (shortlisted for the Periodical Marketers of Canada Award.  Translated into French, German, Italian, Polish, Chinese, Japanese, Swedish, Dutch, Portuguese, Korean, Bulgarian, Hungarian)
 in German: Wie ein Vogel ohne Flügel. Transl. Uschi Gnade. Goldmann, Munich 1993 
Inside Out: Reflection on a Life So Far - (Doubleday, 2001)

Poetry

You Are Not Who You Claim - (Beach Holme, 1990) (winner of the Milton Acorn People's Poetry Award) 
Oedipal Dreams - (Beach Holme, 1992) (nominated for a Governor General's Award and featured in the Michael Radford film, Dancing at the Blue Iguana )
In the House of Slaves - (Coach House, 1994)
Treble (Raincoast, 2005)
Living Under Plastic (Oolichan, 2010) (winner of the Pat Lowther Award)  ....
A Grain of Rice (Oolichan, 2012) (shortlisted for the Dorothy Livesay Award and the Pat Lowther Award)
  Tumour (Oolichan, 2016)

Short stories
Fresh Girls and Other Stories. (HarperCollins, 1993) (shortlisted for the QPB Award for Notable New Fiction.  Translated into German, Chinese, Dutch, Danish, Japanese, Italian, Hungarian)
 in German, transl. Angela Stein: Fetisch & andere Stories. Goldmann, Munich 1996
Choose Me. (Doubleday, 1999)  (translated into Japanese, Swedish)

Significant essays and short pieces
"I Sing the Song of my Condo" Globe and Mail (1995)
"An Insatiable Emptiness" The Georgia Straight (1995)
"On the Road with Family, Friends, and the Usual Questions" Vancouver Sun (1995)
"Me and W.P. " Vancouver Magazine (1997)
"Lay Off Me and W.P. " Globe and Mail (1998)

Novels
Other Women. (Random House, 1995)  (translated into Dutch, German, Italian, Chinese, Korean, Portuguese, Danish, Japanese, Greek, Hebrew, Polish)
 in German, transl. Birgit Moosmüller: Die Frau an seiner Tür. Goldmann, Munich 1996

References

External links
Evelyn Lau at Geist.com
Evelyn Lau Gets Fresh
Evelyn Lau entry at The Canadian Encyclopedia

1971 births
Living people
20th-century Canadian poets
21st-century Canadian poets
20th-century Canadian women writers
21st-century Canadian women writers
Canadian people of Hong Kong descent
20th-century Canadian short story writers
Canadian women poets
Canadian women short story writers
Canadian writers of Asian descent
Homeless people
Writers from Vancouver
21st-century Canadian short story writers
Poets Laureate of places in Canada